Csákánydoroszló is a village in Vas County, Hungary.

Notable people
Joe Eszterhas was born in Csákánydoroszló in 1944.

Populated places in Vas County